Marshall Mouw is a former mayor of Glendora, California.

Mouw was elected to the Glendora City Council in 1991 and was re-elected two times until he decided not to run for re-election in 2003. He served as the city's mayor in 2002–2003.

References

Living people
Mayors of Glendora, California
Year of birth missing (living people)